Lipan art (sometimes spelled as “Lippan” and known in English as Mud and Mirror Work) is a traditional mural craft of Kutch, Gujarat, India. Lippan or mud-washing using materials locally available in the region like mixture of clay and camel dung keeps the interiors of the houses cool. Though the work is limited mainly to the interior walls, it can be found on the outer walls as well. These scintillating murals bring life, gaiety, and beauty to generally harsh life of people of Kutch. 

Mud and Mirror Work is mainly done by the women of the Rabari community.  The women are so experienced in this art form that they usually don’t draw or trace a pattern before beginning work. Rabari is the pastoral community of Kutch, living in the outskirts of its villages. They dwell in a few clusters of communal or family houses known as Bhungas which are designed and built to take care of their practical needs in the harsh climate of Kutch.  
 
This art form has a hoary past as no records are available to trace its origin.  Various communities in Kutch do mud-washing in their own distinct style. Artisans of the Muslim community practicing this art form stick to graphic and eye-catching geometric patterns of lipan kaam, as depicting the human or animal form is considered deeply un-Islamic. 

Mud mirror work gathered attention of the modern world for its intricate pattern and aesthetic perfection and has made a full transition from its unknown modest stature to the mainstream art world, decorating the walls of rural homes

External links
Documentation by Prof. Bibhudutta Baral and Rakshitha NID, Bengaluru
Gurjari website
Mirror Art from India 
Sakal Times

Culture of Kutch
Gujarati culture